Ellington '65 is an album by American pianist, composer and bandleader Duke Ellington recorded in 1964 and released on the Reprise label in 1965. The album features recordings of popular tunes arranged by Ellington and Billy Strayhorn, a formula that was revisited on Ellington '66 (1966).

Reception
The AllMusic review by Matt Collar says: "While Ellington '65 isn't a bad recording, it is by no means required listening and will most likely appeal to die-hard Ellington completists".

Track listing
Side One:
 "Hello, Dolly!" (Jerry Herman) - 2:06  
 "Call Me Irresponsible" (Jimmy Van Heusen, Sammy Cahn) - 3:18  
 "Fly Me to the Moon (In Other Words)" (Bart Howard) - 2:30  
 "The Peking Theme (So Little Time)" (Dimitri Tiomkin, Paul Francis Webster) - 3:03  
 "Danke Schoen" (Milt Gabler, Bert Kaempfert) - 2:35  
 "More (Theme from Mondo Cane)" (Riz Ortolani, Nino Oliviero) - 2:55

Side Two:
 "The Second Time Around" (Cahn, Van Heusen) - 3:43  
 "Never On Sunday" (Manos Hadjidakis) - 3:55  
 "I Left My Heart in San Francisco" (George Cory, Douglass Cross) - 3:02  
 "Blowin' in the Wind" (Bob Dylan) - 2:25  
 "Stranger on the Shore" (Acker Bilk) -  2:50  
Recorded at Fine Studios, New York on April 15 (tracks 2, 7, 8 & 11), April 16 (tracks 3, 4, 6 & 10), & April 27 (tracks 1, 5 & 9), 1964.

Personnel
Duke Ellington – piano
Cat Anderson, Rolf Ericson, Herb Jones, Cootie Williams - trumpet
Lawrence Brown, Buster Cooper - trombone
Chuck Connors - bass trombone
Jimmy Hamilton - clarinet, tenor saxophone
Johnny Hodges - alto saxophone
Russell Procope - alto saxophone, clarinet
Paul Gonsalves, Harry Carney - tenor saxophone
Major Holley - bass 
Sam Woodyard - drums

References

Reprise Records albums
Duke Ellington albums
1965 albums